Namesys was a California corporation responsible for the design and implementation of the ReiserFS and Reiser4 filesystems. Owned by Hans Reiser, Namesys was based in Oakland, California and also operated in Russia. The company also provided support for Linux systems.

The future of the company fell into doubt after Reiser was found guilty of murder and announced plans to sell the company to pay for his legal defense. Their website has not been accessible since November 2007. Edward Shishkin, a Namesys employee, was quoted in a January 2008 CNET article as saying that "commercial activity of Namesys has stopped".

Notes

External links
 namesys.com at Internet Archive
 DARPA SBIR 2004.1 Phase I Award Winners
 File Systems in Linux

Free software companies
Companies based in Oakland, California
2004 establishments in California